Patricia Mafalda DiMango (born May 19, 1953) is a retired American justice of the Supreme Court of Kings County, New York and television personality.

DiMango starred as one of three judges along with Judge Tanya Acker, Judge Michael Corriero, and court room bailiff Sonia Montejano on the panel-based reality court show Hot Bench.

Education
DiMango, a Brooklyn native, earned a Bachelor of Science degree from Brooklyn College at the City University of New York, as well as a Master of Arts degree from Columbia University Teachers College. She received a Juris Doctor degree from the St. John's University School of Law.

Career

DiMango is a former college professor and NYC Public School Teacher. DiMango was appointed as a Judge of the Criminal Court of the City of New York by Mayor Rudolph Giuliani in 1995. She was appointed Acting Justice of the State Supreme Court, 2nd Judicial District in 1998.

She was elected as a justice of the Supreme Court of Kings County in 2002.

Judge DiMango is one of the three judges on the panel court show Hot Bench, created by Judge Judy Sheindlin, that debuted in September 2014.

She is mentioned in a New Yorker article regarding Kalief Browder, she sent a 16-year-old to spend over three years in Rikers Island awaiting trial. According to the article, DiMango was the presiding judge who released Browder on his 31st court appearance.  She has also been involved with numerous other high-profile cases, including murders and other crimes committed against children, and hate crimes.

She guest starred as a judge on season 13, episode 1 of Blue Bloods.

References

Living people
1953 births
New York Supreme Court Justices
Teachers College, Columbia University alumni
Brooklyn College alumni
St. John's University School of Law alumni
Television judges